Howard G. Sands (born February 5, 1962) is a former professional tennis player from the United States.

Biography
Sands, the son of lawyers, is originally from Santa Monica, California.

While competing as junior he had a win over Mats Wilander, in the boys' singles at the 1980 Wimbledon Championships.

A three time singles All-American tennis player at Harvard University, Sands graduated in 1983 with an economics degree, then competed for two years on the professional tour. He featured in the men's doubles main draw at the 1984 US Open with Sean Brawley to make the second round and soon after reached his highest doubles ranking of 99 in the world. At the 1984 Australian Open he lost to Drew Gitlin in the opening round of the singles and also featured in men's doubles with John Mattke, for another first round exit.

He is the founding partner of a private investment company and is based in Los Angeles.

References

External links
 
 

1962 births
Living people
American male tennis players
Harvard Crimson men's tennis players
Tennis players from Santa Monica, California